The Temple of King Kangsa Narayan is situated in northern Bangladesh. It is in Rajshahi's Tahirpur, where legend states that the Durga Puja of the Hindu community was performed for the first time in the Indian subcontinent.

References

Hindu temples in Rajshahi Division